Eupithecia actrix is a moth in the family Geometridae. It is found in central China (Shaanxi).

The fore- and hindwings are pale brownish grey.

References

External links

Moths described in 2006
Endemic fauna of China
actrix
Moths of Asia